Pantego may refer to several United States locations:

 Pantego, Texas
 Pantego, North Carolina
 Pantego Christian Academy, a school with campuses in Tarrant County, Texas